State Route 7 (SR 7) is part of Maine's system of numbered state highways, running from an interchange with U.S. Route 1 (US 1) in Belfast, to an intersection with SR 15 in Dover-Foxcroft.

Between Belfast and Newport, SR 7 is known as the Moosehead Trail. SR 7 follows the east bank of the Sebasticook River between Newport and Dexter, where it turns northeast to Dover-Foxcroft.

Junction list

References

External links

Floodgap Roadgap's RoadsAroundME: Maine State Route 7

007
Transportation in Waldo County, Maine
Transportation in Penobscot County, Maine
Transportation in Piscataquis County, Maine